Colten is a given name.  Notable people with the name include:

People 
Colten Boushie (1993–2016), Indigenous homicide victim
Colten Brewer (born 1992), American baseball player
Colten Hayes (born 1990), Canadian ice hockey player
Colten Teubert (born 1990), Canadian-German ice hockey player

See also
Colton (given name)
Kolten